Grabo may refer to:

Grabo (surname)
Grabo, Ivory Coast
Gråbo, Sweden

See also
Grabos (disambiguation)
Grabow (disambiguation)